{{DISPLAYTITLE:C23H29ClO4}}
The molecular formula C23H29ClO4 (molar mass: 404.93 g/mol, exact mass: 404.1754 u) may refer to:

 Chlormadinone acetate (CMA)
 Cismadinone acetate